"See You Dead" is a song by American alternative metal band Helmet. The song was released in 2004 as the first single from the bands 5th album, Size Matters. It was the band's first single since reforming and their first in nearly seven years.

Track listing

Chart positions

Personnel
 Page Hamilton – vocals, guitar
 Chris Traynor – bass
 John Tempesta – drums

References

2004 songs
2004 singles
Helmet (band) songs
Interscope Records singles
Songs written by Page Hamilton